Tralake is an unincorporated community located in Washington County, Mississippi.

Notable people
 Dusty Brown, musician who played the blues harp; under the Parrot Records label he recorded "Yes She's Gone" and "He Don't Love You".

References

Unincorporated communities in Washington County, Mississippi
Unincorporated communities in Mississippi